In mathematics, a uniformly smooth space is a normed vector space  satisfying the property that for every  there exists  such that if  with  and  then

The modulus of smoothness of a normed space X is the function ρX defined for every  by the formula

The triangle inequality yields that .  The normed space X is uniformly smooth if and only if  tends to 0 as t tends to 0.

Properties
 Every uniformly smooth Banach space is reflexive.
 A Banach space  is uniformly smooth if and only if its continuous dual  is uniformly convex (and vice versa, via reflexivity). The moduli of convexity and smoothness are linked by

and the maximal convex function majorated by the modulus of convexity δX is given by 

Furthermore,

 A Banach space is uniformly smooth if and only if the limit

exists uniformly for all  (where  denotes the unit sphere of ).
When , the Lp-spaces are uniformly smooth (and uniformly convex).

Enflo proved 
that the class of Banach spaces that admit an equivalent uniformly convex norm coincides with the class of super-reflexive Banach spaces, introduced by Robert C. James.  
As a space is super-reflexive if and only if its dual is super-reflexive, it follows that the class of Banach spaces that admit an equivalent uniformly convex norm coincides with the class of spaces that admit an equivalent uniformly smooth norm.  The Pisier renorming theorem 
states that a super-reflexive space X admits an equivalent uniformly smooth norm for which the modulus of smoothness ρX satisfies, for some constant C and some 

It follows that every super-reflexive space Y admits an equivalent uniformly convex norm for which the modulus of convexity satisfies, for some constant  and some positive real q

If a normed space admits two equivalent norms, one uniformly convex and one uniformly smooth, the Asplund averaging technique produces another equivalent norm that is both uniformly convex and uniformly smooth.

See also

 Uniformly convex space

Notes

References

  
.

Banach spaces
Convex analysis